Dorothy Grant  is an Indigenous fashion designer whose works have gained public recognition as expressions of living Haida culture.

Biography

Early life 
Grant was born in Hydaburg, Alaska, but was raised in Ketchikan. She is a Kaigani Haida of the Raven Clan from the Brown Bear house of Howkan. Her family crests include Two-Finned Killer Whale, Shark, Berry Picker in the Moon, and Brown Bear. Grant attended the Helen Lefeaux School of Fashion Design in 1987.

Professional development 
Grant broke onto the scene in the early 1980s when she began sketching Haida artwork onto clothing. Grant's first collection was debuted in 1989 and featured 55 pieces. About the collection's debut, Grant has said, "It had a big impact because nobody was doing it at the time". Lisa Tant noted in her article "Dorothy Grant's Haida Couture", for BC Woman, that Grant was the first "Aboriginal designer to combine traditional Haida ceremonial dress with contemporary fashion." For example, some of her pieces utilize the tapering lines (Formline art) of the Haida ceremonial copper, notably its central T-ridge. Indeed, Grant has gained international acclaim for producing garments that infuse myth with fabric and for using fashion to share Canadian Northwest culture with a broader audience. This event brought much demand for Grant's work, "I just remember being so busy for several months after that with people coming and wanting to order things". In 1994, the Dorothy Grant Boutique opened at the Sinclair Centre in Vancouver, BC.

Grant's critics have accused her of "going commercial", however Grant refutes such claims, arguing that if fashion products are produced with a "certain finesse that represents Haida culture and Canada, I don't think that's a sell-out. I think that's a positive step toward creating an employment for Native people and a national identity."

By 1999, after five successful years in retail, Grant was granted the National Aboriginal Achievement Award, now the Indspire Awards in recognition of her successful venture, the First Nations Drum, Canada's largest First Nations newspaper. Grant closed her retail store in 2008 and moved into a studio in Vancouver’s SOMA District.

Grant continues to be recognized for both her artistic talent and business skill. In 2003, the Asper Business Institute named Grant "Business Woman of the Year." Six years later, B.C. Aboriginal Business Awards awarded Grant the "Individual Achievement Award."

In 2020, her work was exhibited in the landmark exhibition Hearts of Our People: Native Women Artists at the Smithsonian American Art Museum.

Notable clients include Robin Williams, Marie Osmond, and Susan Aglukark.

Collector recognition 
In addition to clothing North American dignitaries and celebrities, Grant’s detailed garments are available for public viewing in 13 museums from Canada to the United Kingdom.

The Canadian Museum of Civilization in Ottawa purchased, "Raven Creation Tunic," a garment depicting a Raven myth, and "Hummingbird Copper Panel Dress" for their permanent collection. Also available for public viewing in Ottawa, ON, is Grant’s "Seven Raven Button Blanket," part of the permanent exhibit at the National Gallery of Canada. Further west, the Museum of Anthropology in Vancouver, BC, holds Grant’s "Raven Greatcoat."

Other notable museum displays include: "Raven Cape," Vancouver Museum in Vancouver, BC; "Supernatural Frog Button Robe," in DeYoung Museum in San Francisco, CA; "Raven Coat," formerly displayed by the Seattle Art Museum in Seattle, WA; "Shark Blanket," in Burke Museum in Seattle, WA; "Raven Chilkat Robe," in the Natural History Museum in New York NY; "Raven Button Robe" in the Liverpool World Museum in Liverpool, UK.

In 2016, Grant designed a tuxedo for The Revenant's Duane Howard to wear to the Oscars.

Product lines 
Dorothy Grant, Grant’s designer label, offers men and women’s clothing. While her designer label work has gained recognition by Hollywood and collectors alike, she launched Red Raven in 2010 in conjunction with the 2010 Winter Olympics in Vancouver, BC.

Awards and honours
 Royal Canadian Academy of Arts
 Member of the Order of Canada.
 Best Professional Design Award
 Winds of Change design competition – "Best Designer" award
 Voted One of 100 Most Influential Women in British Columbia by Vancouver Sun Newspaper
 BC Achievement Award for Individual Lifetime Achievement Award in Business
 "A Single Thread: Celebrating Native American Indian Design & Style" design award
 2007 Eric and Barbara Dobkin Fellowship at the School for Advanced Research
 Royal Canadian Academy Prestigious Award for the Arts
 Asper Business Institute – "Business Woman of the Year" award
 National Aboriginal Achievement Business Award
 Winds of Change design competition – "Best Designer" award
 National Aboriginal Achievement Award
 Asper Business Institute "Business Woman of the Year"

Further reading 
 Fried, Nicky. "Fashion by Dorothy Grant." In Equity. January/February 1990: 9 - 10.
 Tant, Lisa. "Fashion News." In Flare: Canada's Fashion Magazine. June 1990: 88.

References 

Alaska Native people
Haida artists
People from Ketchikan, Alaska
Northwest Coast art
Members of the Royal Canadian Academy of Arts
Members of the Order of Canada
Indspire Awards
Indigenous fashion designers of the Americas
Canadian fashion designers
Canadian women fashion designers
First Nations women artists